The mining industry of Botswana has dominated the national economy of Botswana since the 1970s. Diamond has been the leading component of the mineral sector since large-scale diamond production began in 1972 by Debswana. Most of Botswana's diamond production is of gem quality, resulting in the country's position as the world's leading producer of diamond by value. Copper, gold, nickel, coal and soda ash production also has held significant, though smaller, roles in the economy. 

In 2005, mining accounted for about 38% of Botswana's real gross domestic product (GDP), and more than 50% of government revenues were derived from mining and mineral-processing activity. In 2005, the nominal value of minerals produced in Botswana exceeded that of 2004 by about 20% in U.S. dollars. Much of the increase was attributed to higher international mineral prices. Diamond, copper-nickel matte, and gold, in order of value, accounted for most of the increase.

Botswana encompasses an area of 600,379 square kilometers in southern Africa and is bordered by Namibia, Zambia, South Africa, and Zimbabwe. Most merchandise trade is shipped via rail or truck through South Africa. The total value of exports in 2005 was about $4.66 billion. Mineral exports, of which diamond accounted for $3.3 billion; copper and nickel matte, about $461 million; soda ash, about $65 million; and gold, about $36 million, represented 83% of total merchandise exports. The provisional value of imports in 2005 was $3.28 billion.

Commodities

Copper and Nickel
In eastern Botswana, about 200 kilometers (km) south of Francistown, the smelter operated by BCL Ltd. of Botswana processed copper-nickel concentrate from the company's Selebi-Phikwe Mine. Under an agreement signed in 2001 by Centametall AG of Switzerland and Falconbridge International Ltd. of Barbados, BCL also toll-smelted concentrate from the Phoenix open pit mine, which was operated by Tati Nickel Mining Co. (a subsidiary of LionOre Mining International Ltd. of Canada). During 2005, the BCL smelter produced 68,637 metric tons (t) of nickel-copper-cobalt matte. Centametall and Falconbridge shipped the nickel matte to the Falconbridge Nikkelverk, AS refinery in Norway and RioZim Ltd.’s Eiffel Flats refinery in Zimbabwe.

In 2002, BCL and Falconbridge agreed to extend to 2015 the tolling agreement under which BCL-mined nickel matte was refined in Norway. The reserves at the Selebi-Phikwe Mine, however, were expected to be exhausted by 2011 or 2012. In 2005, the Government continued to evaluate proposals to sustain the town of Selebi-Phikwe after the closure of the mine and to minimize the potential negative impact of the closure on operations of the BCL smelter, the Botswana Power Corporation, the Botswana Railways, and the Morupule Colliery. The BCL operation accounted for about 60% of Botswana's industrial sector's total energy consumption.

The output of copper-nickel matte from the BCL smelter traditionally has exceeded the smelter's 40,000-metric-ton-per-year (t/yr) design capacity, often by more than 30%. Despite the adverse effect of cyclical metals prices during the past two decades and the looming closure of the Selebi-Phikwe Mine, the design capacity of BCL smelter recently was expanded to 60,000 t/yr. In 2005, matte output exceeded the smelter's new design capacity. Because the BCL smelter might shut down with the closure of the Selebi-Phikwe Mine, LionOre had initiated in 2003 a pilot plant project to evaluate the recovery of copper and nickel from the Phoenix Mine by using Western Minerals Technology Pty. Ltd.’s Activox process. In 2005, a feasibility study of an Activox plant with an output capacity of 25,000 t/yr of nickel was underway. The study was expected to be completed in mid-2006.

Several copper and nickel exploration projects were underway as of 2005. African Copper plc continued its evaluation of the Dukwe copper project, which was located about 130 km northwest of Francistown, and the adjacent Matsitama licenses. African Copper successfully completed a feasibility study of an open pit, heap leach, and solvent extraction/electrowinning operation to process the oxidized ore at Dukwe and started a feasibility study of the underground development of the sulfide zone at Dukwe. African Copper proposed to begin a 10,000-meter infill drill program at Matsitama in 2006.

In 2005, Discovery Nickel Ltd. continued its exploration drilling on the Northeast Botswana Brownfields nickel project, which included the Dikoloti, the Dikoloti North, the Kima, and the Lentswe prospects. In 2005, Discovery Nickel acquired seven prospecting licenses in northwest Botswana that formed the Maun copper project. Tau Mining Botswana (Pty.) Ltd. [a subsidiary of African Platinum plc (Afplats) of the United Kingdom] completed a preliminary evaluation of its Molopo Farms prospect, which was located about 175 km west of Gaborone. Because of higher priority projects in southern Africa, Afplats decided to divest its interest in the Molopo Farms prospect.

WMC Resources Exploration Pty. Ltd. of Australia was acquired by the BHP Billiton Group in 2005. The WMC/BHP Billiton joint venture with Albidon Ltd. of Australia conducted airborne and ground electromagnetic surveys, mapping, and soil sampling on its Selebi-Phikwe nickel project. Activity on the Tati nickel project, which was a joint venture of Albidon and Gallery Gold Ltd. of Australia, included the completion of a reconnaissance drilling program on the Kismet and the Tekwane nickel prospects.

Gold
European discovery of the Tati Goldfields lead to the first southern Africa goldrush. Among the mines founded in the Tati Goldfields were the Monarch and the Mupane.

The Mupane Mine, which is located about 30 km southwest of Francistown, was operated by Mupane Gold (a subsidiary of Galane Gold). In 2005, ore was sourced from the oxide and transition zones of the Tau open pit and, after mid-year, the oxide zone of the Tholo pit. At the Mupane plant, Mupane Gold commissioned a ball mill, installed a flotation plant to handle sulfide and transition zone gold ore, and upgraded the oxygen plant. Gallery Gold continued exploration of other gold occurrences near the Mupane facility; these included the Jim's Luck prospect; the Maitengwe lease; the Golden Eagle, the Lady Mary 2, and the Map Nora prospects on the Sashe license; the Ratomo and the Signal Hill prospects in the Tati Belt; and the Vumba lease. At year end IAMGOLD Corp. of Canada proposed to acquire Gallery Gold and Gallery Gold's Botswana operations.

Diamonds
Debswana (a 50-50 joint partnership of De Beers Centenary AG and the Government) accounted for all diamond production in Botswana from its four mines. Debswana continued its recovery from the labor unrest that had resulted in a 2-week strike in 2004. In 2005, Debswana treated about 31.2 million metric tons (Mt) of ore to yield , which was a weight increase of more than 2% compared with 2004. The production decline at Orapa was attributed to the loss of a haul road because of a ramp failure and a fire, which destroyed a loading shovel.

De Beers and the Government agreed that some of De Beer's Diamond Trading Company's operations would move from London, United Kingdom, to Gaborone, Botswana. Local marketing of domestically produced gemstones was expected to help the local diamond cutting and polishing companies.

A large number of many other companies were exploring for diamond in Botswana. Active exploration operations included those of Boteti Exploration (Pty.) Ltd., which was a joint venture between De Beers (51%) and African Diamonds plc (49%); Gcwihaba Resources (Pty.) Ltd. (a subsidiary of Tsodilo Resources Ltd.); Helio Resources Corp.; Newdico (Pty.) Ltd., which was a joint venture of Tsodilo (81%) and the Trans Hex Group (19%); Tawana Resources N.L.; and the joint ventures of De Beers and Firestone Diamonds plc; Motapa Diamonds Inc. and Stornoway Diamond Corp.; and Rio Tinto Mining and Exploration Ltd. and Trivalence Mining Corp. In addition, DiamonEx Ltd. of Australia started a reevaluation of the Martin's Drift prospect, which was a 5-kimberlite deposit that had been trial mined by Tswapong Mining Co. from 1998 to 2001, and Petra Diamonds Ltd. of the Channel Islands acquired Kalahari Diamond Ltd. and its Botswana-based subsidiary Sekaka Diamonds (Pty.) Ltd. There might be anew Canadian mine Tango Gold mines ltd starting the work next year.

Coal
Coal is a combustible black or brownish-black sedimentary rock with a high amount of carbon and hydrocarbons. Coal is classified as a nonrenewable energy source because it takes millions of years to form. Coal contains the energy stored by plants that lived hundreds of millions of years ago in swampy forests.  Layers of dirt and rock covered the plants over millions of years. The resulting pressure and heat turned the plants into the substance we call coal.

Debswana operated the Morupule Colliery at Palapye, which is located about 175 km south of Francistown. Much of the company's coal production was sold to the adjacent Morupule Power Station (MPS) of Botswana Power Corp. (BPC). Record coal sales in 2005 were 967,242 t, which was an 8% increase compared with the total in 2004. A coal washing plant was under construction.

In 2005, Coal Investment Corp. (CIC) of the British Virgin Islands and Meepong Investments (Pty.) Ltd. of Botswana entered into a joint venture to reevaluate the Mmamabula coal project. Mmamabula previously had been explored extensively by a number of organizations, which included AMAX Exploration Inc. of the United States, Anglo American Corp. of South Africa, the coal division of British Petroleum Ltd. of the United Kingdom, Charbonnages de France International Botswana, the Geological Survey of the Bechuanaland Protectorate, the Geological Survey of Botswana, and Shell Coal Botswana Ltd. Mmamabula's inland location and lack of process water had thwarted the prospect's development as a coal export project in the early 1980s. In 2005, CIC's local subsidiary, Meepong Resources (Pty) Ltd., proceeded with a feasibility study of the Mmamabula license, and the U.S. Trade and Development Agency awarded a contract to Delphos International, Ltd. of the United States to provide financial advisory assistance to the Botswana Ministry of Minerals, Energy, and Water Resources for the development of a 1,200-megawatt coal-fired powerplant at Mmamabula.

Outlook
International interest in exploration for diamond and base and precious metals is expected to continue. The country's favorable geologic environment, mineral investment climate, low tax rates, and political stability are expected to continue to make Botswana a foreign mineral investment magnet. The Government encourages mineral value-added processing, but the paucity of water in landlocked Botswana has deterred large-scale industrial development. The country's small domestic market, the cost of transportation to ports in South Africa, and the perception of rampant Human Immunodeficiency Virus/Acquired Immune Deficiency Syndrome (HIV/AIDS) epidemic also limit the nation's attractiveness to investment by foreign manufacturers. High fuel costs would continue to affect the cost of transportation of Botswana's imports and exports adversely.

Revenues from diamond operations are expected to continue to be the mainstay of the country's economy for the foreseeable future, although Debswana has scheduled lower production volumes. Copper, gold, nickel, and soda ash production and processing also are expected to continue to be notable factors in the country's economy.

Given the country's extensive coal resources and projected regional power demand, Botswana has the potential to develop and support a small-scale coal-bed methane industry and additional coal-fueled electricity-generating plants that could supply power to the South African Power Pool through its land lines to South Africa.

References

 
Economy of Botswana